Elections were held in March 1952 for the Bihar Legislative Assembly. There were 276 constituencies with 50 of them being two-member constituencies. The Indian National Congress (INC) stormed into power. Shri Krishna Singh became the first elected Chief Minister of Bihar and Dr. Anugrah Narayan Sinha became the first Deputy Chief Minister cum Finance Minister of the state.

Parties

National parties
 Bharatiya Jana Sangh
 Communist Party of India
 Forward Bloc (Marxist Group)
 Forward Bloc (Ruikar)
 Akhil Bharatiya Hindu Mahasabha
 Indian National Congress
 Kisan Mazdoor Praja Party
 Akhil Bharatiya Ram Rajya Parishad
 Revolutionary Socialist Party
 Scheduled Caste Federation
 Socialist Party

State parties
 Chota Nagpur Santhal Parganas Janata Party
 Jharkhand Party
 Lok Sewak Sangh
 All India United Kisan Sabha

Registered (unrecognised) parties
 All India Gantantra Parishad

Results

!colspan=10|
|-
! colspan=2| Political party !! Flag !! Seats  Contested !! Won !! % of  Seats !! Votes !! Vote %
|- style="background: #90EE90;"
| 
| style="text-align:left;" |Indian National Congress
| 
| 322 || 239 || 72.42 || 39,51,145 || 41.38
|-
| 
| style="text-align:left;" |Socialist Party
|
| 266 || 23 || 6.97 || 17,29,750 || 18.11
|-
| 
| style="text-align:left;" |Kisan Mazdoor Praja Party
|
| 98 || 1 || 0.30 || 2,68,416 || 2.81
|-
| 
|
| 53 || 32 || 9.70 || 7,65,272 || 8.01
|-
|
|
| 38 || 11 || 3.33 || 3,01,691 || 3.16
|-
| 
| style="text-align:left;" |Forward Bloc (Marxist Group)
|
| 34 || 1 || 0.30 || 1,07,386 || 1.12
|-
| 
| style="text-align:left;" |Akhil Bharatiya Ram Rajya Parishad
|
| 29 || 1 || 0.30 || 60,360 || 0.63
|-
|
|
| 12 || 7 || 2.12 || 1,48,921 || 1.56
|-
|
|
| 1 || 1 || 0.30 || 14,237 || 0.15
|-
| 
|
| 638 || 14 || 4.24 || 18,77,236 || 19.66
|- class="unsortable" style="background-color:#E9E9E9"
! colspan = 3| Total seats
! 330 !! style="text-align:center;" |Voters !! 2,41,65,389 !! style="text-align:center;" |Turnout !! 95,48,835 (39.51%)
|}

Elected members

State Reorganization
Bihar was reduced slightly by the transfer of minor territories to West Bengal in 1956 under States Reorganisation Act, 1956. Hence the constituencies were reduced from 330 in 1951 to 318 in 1957 elections.

See also
 1951–52 elections in India
 1957 Bihar Legislative Assembly election

References

1952
1952
Bihar